Cape Santiago is a cape on the easternmost point of the island of Taiwan, located in the Gongliao District, New Taipei City.

History
On 5 May 1626, a Spanish fleet reached the northeast tip of Taiwan and named the native village of Caquiunauan (also Caguiuanuan; present-day Fulong Village) as Santiago. Later this name was extended to the nearby cape.

Tourist attractions
There is a lighthouse situated on Cape Santiago, called Cape Santiago Lighthouse. A nearby beach, Yenliao (鹽寮), was the site of the first landing for the Japanese invasion of Taiwan in 1895.

See also 
 List of tourist attractions in Taiwan
 Fort Santo Domingo
 Fort Zeelandia (Taiwan)
 Fort Provintia
 List of Taiwanese superlatives

Footnotes

References

Bibliography

External links

 Northeast and Yilan Coast National Scenic Area-Taiwan  

Historic sites in Taiwan
Landforms of New Taipei
Tourist attractions in New Taipei
Spanish East Indies
Santiago